Niell Jacobs (born 30 June 1988) is a South African rugby union player, currently playing with the . His regular position is centre or fly-half. He is the twin brother of Ruan Jacobs.

Career

Youth

Senior career

He made several appearances for them over the next two seasons and also represented  in the 2011 Varsity Cup.

References

South African rugby union players
Living people
1988 births
Rugby union players from Pretoria
Leopards (rugby union) players
Border Bulldogs players
North-West University alumni
Rugby union fly-halves